</ref>

History

Foundation of the magazine 
Its first publication was on July 30, 2012, whose file was treated by Friendship and Sadness according to Montaigne. "The Committee", as the magazine is generally known, was created by Meneses Monroy who is its director. Currently, within the Editorial Committee are the writers, Meneses Monroy, Asmara Gay, who is the editor of the magazine and Patricia Oliver, as Chief of Staff. The Editorial Board is composed by Agustín Cadena, Guadalupe Flores Liera, Claudia Hernández de Valle Arizpe, Daniel Olivares Viniegra, Juan Antonio Rosado Zacarías, Eduardo Torre Cantalapiedra and E. J. Valdés. Counselor in Visual Arts: Elsa Madrigal.

The name of "The Committee 1973" is due to two fundamental reasons. On the one hand, "The Committee" carries a horizontal spirit, since all the members of the magazine can publish in it and make decisions regarding the themes or the artistic creation of the publication. There is, then, a democratic spirit. As for the year that is part of the name of the magazine, 1973, refers to the date of the death of the poet Pablo Neruda, which, in some way, tries to be a tribute to this Nobel Prize, whom Gabriel García Márquez called: "the greatest poet of the twentieth century in any language."

IV Anniversary 
In September 2016, the collaborators of the magazine celebrated its fourth anniversary in Casa Lamm. Asmara Gay, Patricia Oliver, Daniel Olivares Viniegra and Meneses Monroy were there among other members presenting the number 24 of the magazine.

V Anniversary 
In November 2017, "The Committee" celebrated its fifth anniversary in the Urban Artists Auditorium of the Cultural Center of Contemporary Mexico, with the presence of Daniel Olivares Viniegra, poet and writer; Meneses Monroy, director of the magazine; Claudia Hernández de Valle Arizpe, long-time poet; and Asmara Gay, editor and writer of diverse literary genres.

Theme 
The magazine "The Committee 1973" throughout all its issues, offers a critical and proactive look at artistic creation, both in the themes it deals with and in the artistic proposal of its authors. The revision of universal themes that motivate the creation can be found in the numbers devoted to friendship, madness, sex, music, but they have also dedicated some editions to the revision of the classic or historical literary work, both in Mexico and in various countries: Hungary, The Renaissance, France, British Isles, Germany, Greece, Rome, to name a few. Another topic that stands out in its publications is the debate on aesthetic creation: translation, literary criticism, microliterature, black novel, censorship, the problem of language, literary vanguards, and even through the pages of the magazine you can find topics more cryptic or proactive such as: black humor, impossible cities, the other and its difference, fantastic zoology.

References

External links
 Revistas Culturales de México
Revista El Comité 1973

 
2012 establishments in Mexico
Bi-monthly magazines
Independent magazines
Literary magazines published in Mexico
Magazines established in 2012
Online literary magazines
Spanish-language magazines
Visual arts magazines